David J. E. Callaway is a biological nanophysicist in the New York University School of Medicine, where he is Professor and Laboratory Director. He was trained as a theoretical physicist by Richard Feynman, Kip Thorne, and Cosmas Zachos, and was previously an associate professor at the Rockefeller University after positions at CERN and Los Alamos National Laboratory.  Callaway's laboratory discovered potential therapeutics for Alzheimer's disease based upon apomorphine after an earlier paper of his developed models of Alzheimer amyloid formation. He has also initiated the study of protein domain dynamics by neutron spin echo spectroscopy, providing a way to observe protein nanomachines in motion.

Previous work includes the invention of the microcanonical ensemble approach to lattice gauge theory with Aneesur Rahman, work on the convexity of the effective potential of quantum field theory, work on Langevin dynamics in quantum field theory with John R. Klauder, a monograph on quantum triviality, constraints on the Higgs boson and papers on black holes and superconductors. His work in these areas is highly cited and notable.

Athletic accomplishments

Dr Callaway is an avid expedition mountaineer and polar 
explorer. He was a competitor on the first Eco-Challenge.

References

External links

Callaway's publications at the Google Cite database
Homepage at NYU
List of publications in high energy, computational and condensed matter physics on the Inspire database
 List of biological and medical physics publications on the PubMed database
Publications on ResearchGate
     ORCID ID

American biophysicists
American mountain climbers
California Institute of Technology alumni
Living people
Nanophysicists
21st-century American physicists
Year of birth missing (living people)
People associated with CERN